Rajpur Road Legislative Assembly constituency is one of the 70 Legislative Assembly constituencies of Uttarakhand state in India.

It is part of Dehradun district and is reserved for candidates belonging to the Scheduled castes.

Members of the Legislative Assembly

Election results

2022

2017

See also
 Rajpur (Uttarakhand Assembly constituency)

References

External links
  

Dehradun district
Assembly constituencies of Uttarakhand